S.H.I.E.L.D. is a comic book series published by Marvel Comics, premiering with a first issue cover dated June 2010. It details the secret history of the occult organization S.H.I.E.L.D. The series is written by Jonathan Hickman and drawn by Dustin Weaver.

Publication history
The series was published from 2010 to 2012. The series was renumbered after issue 6.

Plot
The series details the secret history of an occult organization called the Brotherhood of the Shield, with a history extending back to ancient Egypt.

The main story of the first issue is set in 1953 shortly after the death of Soviet dictator Joseph Stalin, during the height of the Cold War. Shield agents Nathaniel Richards and Howard Stark enlist a young man named Leonid with unspecified superpowers into the organization, taking him to Shield's High Council in the Immortal City under Rome. The High Council reveals that they know "the final fate of Man", and their mission is to ensure nothing threatens the world before this occurs. They have chosen Leonid because he has a destiny. Flashbacks reveal that the Shield was founded by Imhotep following a battle (alongside Apocalypse and the original Moon Knight) against the Brood, and that previous agents include Zhang Heng (who tricked a Celestial into using the sun to give birth to its child instead of destroying the Earth or the Moon to do so), Galileo Galilei (who fought against Galactus) and Leonardo da Vinci (who is shown with a mysterious device, flying off in an ornithopter).

Leonid spends three years working with the Shield before being visited by his father, a superhuman named the Night Machine who has encountered the Shield before, and apparently been killed by them. The Night Machine gives Leonid the key to a secret area of the headquarters, saying his destiny cannot be dictated by others. The issue ends with Leonid meeting Leonardo da Vinci, who has apparently traveled through time to use his device to save the world. Leonardo's return was met with resistance from Isaac Newton who saw it as a threat to his reign as leader of the organization. This eventually leads to a great schism that divides the Shield into two factions; one led by Leonardo da Vinci and one led by Newton. Meanwhile, the child of a Celestial, the Star Child, is picked up by Leonardo from the sun.

Also connected to the story are Renaissance man Michelangelo who as The Forever Man has amazing superhuman powers of time and space manipulation and Nostradamus who was doused with the Infinity formula and tortured for centuries by Newton to tell the future for centuries. It is later discovered that The Night Machine is really Nikola Tesla who received his cybernetic implants from Michelangelo. Tesla is also discovered to be Leonid's adoptive father and that his biological father was Newton. The reader learns that Newton murdered Galileo Galilei and a host of others to meet his needs.

Night Machine, Stark, and Richards return to the city, and put a stop to the conflict by deciding to put the decision to Leonid on who is right, he chooses Leonardo da Vinci. Newton escapes to the future. Meanwhile, the Star Child goes mad on seeing that the world will end. The second volume stalled at issue 4, with the 5th issue completed not to be published until the 6th issue is ready to be started. Jonathan Hickman (writer) and Dustin Weaver (artist) were tied up with the Marvel summer crossover events for 2013.

Reception
The first volume of the series holds an average rating of 8.0 by forty-one critics and the second a rating of 8.6 by thirteen critics according to review aggregation website Comic Book Roundup.

Prints

Issues

One-shots

Collected editions

See also
 2010 in comics
 2012 in comics

References

External links
 S.H.I.E.L.D. (2010) at the Comic Book DB
 S.H.I.E.L.D. (2011) at the Comic Book DB

2010 comics debuts
Comics by Jonathan Hickman
Marvel Comics titles
Spy comics
Superhero comics
S.H.I.E.L.D. titles